Aursunden or Aursund is a lake in the municipality of Røros in Trøndelag county, Norway.  The village of Brekken lies along the eastern shore and the village of Glåmos lies along the western shore.

There are several inflows to the  lake including the lakes Rien, Riasten, and Bolagen. The outflow is regulated by a hydropower dam through which water passes into the river Glomma.

Aursunden is often cited as the source of the river Glomma, the longest and largest river in Norway. The actual headwaters are near Aursunden near the start of the Glommadal valley.

See also
List of lakes in Norway

References

Lakes of Trøndelag
Røros
Reservoirs in Norway